Megalopalpus zymna, the common harvester, is a butterfly in the family Lycaenidae. It is found in Liberia, Côte d'Ivoire, Ghana, Togo, Nigeria, Cameroon, Equatorial Guinea (Mbini and Bioko), Gabon, the Republic of the Congo, the Central African Republic, Angola, the Democratic Republic of the Congo, southern Sudan, Uganda, north-western Tanzania and Zambia. The habitat is forest and dense agricultural land.

Adults mimic distasteful day-flying moths. Both sexes have been recorded feeding from the secretions of the Auchenorrhyncha species that the larvae feed on.

The larvae are carnivorous. They feed on Auchenorrhyncha species belonging to the families Cicadellidae and Membracidae, including Leptocentrus altifrons, Anchon relatum, Gargara variegata and Nehela ornata. They creep up on their prey, periodically stopping and vibrating the true legs. On reaching the prey, the legs are vibrated on the closed wings of their target, much as the tending ants do with their antennae. The larva then raises its body over the cicadellid, then drops onto it, grasping it with its true legs.  The prey is killed by a bite to the back of the neck, then completely consumed, the legs of the larva aiding in holding the prey and guiding the prey to its mouth. The larvae are dark brown. They are associated with the ant species Pheidole aurivillii race kasaiensis and Camponotus akwapimensis var. poultoni.

References

External links
Seitz, A. Die Gross-Schmetterlinge der Erde 13: Die Afrikanischen Tagfalter. Plate XIII 65 f

Butterflies described in 1851
Miletinae